Dan Chang is the northwesternmost district (amphoe) of Suphan Buri province, central Thailand.

History 
Dan Chang was created as a minor district (king amphoe) on 30 August 1974 by splitting off three tambons, Dan Chang, Ong Phra, and Huai Khamin, from Doem Bang Nang Buat district. The next year, subdistrict Nong Makha Mong was transferred from Doem Bang Nang Buat to the minor district. The minor district was upgraded to a full district on 13 July 1981.

Lauda Air Flight 004 crashed at a site three nautical miles north of Phu Toei, Huai Khamin, Dan Chang in 1991.

Geography 
Neighboring districts are (from the north clockwise): Ban Rai of Uthai Thani province; Noen Kham of Chainat province; Doem Bang Nang Buat and Nong Ya Sai of Suphan Buri Province; and Lao Khwan, Nong Prue, and Si Sawat of Kanchanaburi province. 

Phu Toei National Park is in Dan Chang District. The important water resource of Dan Chang is the Krasiao River which is impounded by the district's Krasiao Dam in Huai Khamin Subdistrict.

Administration

Central administration 
Dan Chang is divided into seven subdistricts (tambons), which are further subdivided into 93 administrative villages (mubans).

Local administration 
There is one subdistrict municipality (thesaban tambon) in the district:
 Dan Chang consisting of parts of subdistricts Nong Makha Mong and Dan Chang.

There are seven subdistrict administrative organizations (SAO) in the district:
 Nong Makha Mong consisting of parts of subdistrict Nong Makha Mong.
 Dan Chang consisting of parts of subdistrict Dan Chang.
 Huai Khamin consisting of subdistrict Huai Khamin.
 Ong Phra consisting of subdistrict Ong Phra.
 Wang Khan consisting of subdistrict Wang Khan.
 Nikhom Krasiao consisting of subdistrict Nikhom Krasiao.
 Wang Yao consisting of subdistrict Wang Yao.

References

External links 

amphoe.com

Dan Chang